Tuitestown is a townland in County Westmeath, Ireland. It is located about north–north–east of Mullingar.

Tuitestown is one of 3 townlands of the civil parish of Kilpatrick in the barony of Fore in the Province of Leinster. The neighbouring townlands are: Derrynagaragh to the north, Clondalever to the east, Taghmon to the south and Gartlandstown to the west.

In the 1911 census of Ireland there were 7 houses and 41 inhabitants in the townland.

References

External links
Map of Tuitestown at openstreetmap.org
Tuitestown at The IreAtlas Townland Data Base
Tuitestown at Townlands.ie
Tuitestown at the Placenames Database of Ireland

Townlands of County Westmeath